The following is a list of notable educational institutions in Mumbai.

Universities
 Amity University, Mumbai
 Dr. Homi Bhabha State University, Mumbai
 Maharashtra National Law University, Mumbai
 SNDT Women's University
 Somaiya Vidyavihar University
 SVKM's NMIMS (Narsee Monjee Institute of Management Studies)
 University of Mumbai

Degree colleges

Applied arts and architecture
 L S Raheja School of Architecture, Bandra
 Sir J. J. College of Architecture, Fort

Commerce, science and arts

 Bhavan's College, Andheri West
 Chetana College, Bandra East
 Centre for Excellence in Basic Sciences
 D. G. Ruparel College of Arts, Science and Commerce, Matunga
 Elphinstone College, Fort
 Guru Nanak Khalsa College of Arts, Science & Commerce, Matunga
 H.R. College of Commerce and Economics, Churchgate
 Institute of Forensic Science, Mumbai, Fort
 Jai Hind College, Churchgate
 K. P. B. Hinduja College of Commerce, Charni Road
 Kirti M. Doongursee College, Dadar West
 Kishinchand Chellaram College (K. C. College), Churchgate
 Kohinoor College of Hotel and Tourism Management
 Malini Kishor Sanghvi College of Commerce & Economics, Vile Parle
 Mithibai College, Vile Parle
 Narsee Monjee College of Commerce and Economics, Vile Parle
 Patkar-Varde College, Goregaon
 Ramnarain Ruia College, Matunga
 Ramniranjan Anandilal Podar College of Commerce and Economics, Matunga
 Ramniranjan Jhunjhunwala College of Arts, Science & Commerce, Ghatkopar West
 Royal College of Science, Arts and Commerce, Mira Road
 Sanpada College of Commerce and Technology, Sanpada
 Sathaye College (formerly "Parle College"), Vile Parle
 Shri M.D. Shah Mahila College of Arts and Commerce, Malad West
 SIES College of Arts, Science & Commerce, Sion West
 SIES College of Commerce and Economics, Sion East
 Somaiya Vidyavihar, Vidyavihar East
 Sophia College for Women, Sion East
 South Indians' Welfare Society College, Wadala
 SPDT Lions Juhu College of Arts, Commerce and Science, Mumbai, Andheri East
 St. Andrew's College of Arts, Science and Commerce, Bandra
 St. Xavier's College, Dhobitalao
 Swami Vivekanand International School and Junior College, Kandivali
 Sydenham College of Commerce and Economics, Churchgate
 Thakur College of Science and Commerce, Kandivali East
 Tolani College of Commerce Andheri East 
 V. G. Vaze College of Arts, Science and Commerce, (formerly Kelkar College), Mulund East
 Vani Vidyalaya, Mulund West
 VIVA College, Virar
 Wilson College, Girgaon
 R. D. National College, Bandra
 Birla College of Arts, Science & Commerce, Kalyan

Engineering schools

 Datta Meghe College of Engineering
 Dwarkadas J. Sanghvi College of Engineering
 Fr. Conceicao Rodrigues Institute of Technology
 IIT Bombay 
 Institute of Chemical Technology
 K. J. Somaiya College of Engineering
 Lokmanya Tilak College of Engineering
 M. H. Saboo Siddik College of Engineering
 Mukesh Patel School of Technology Management & Engineering
 Rajiv Gandhi Institute of Technology
 Rustomjee Academy for Global Careers
 Rizvi College of Engineering
 Sardar Patel College of Engineering
 Sardar Patel Institute of Technology
SIES Graduate School of Technology
 Thadomal Shahani Engineering College
 Thakur College of Engineering and Technology
 Veermata Jijabai Technological Institute
 Vidyalankar Institute of Technology
 Vivekanand Education Society's Institute of Technology

Schools

 Aditya Birla World Academy
 Ajmera Global School
 Balmohan Vidyamandir
 BD Somani International School
 Bombay Scottish School, Mahim
 Bombay Scottish School, Powai
 B P M High School
 Cambridge School (Kandivali)
 Campion School, Mumbai
 Cardinal Gracias High School
 Cathedral and John Connon School
 Children's Academy
 Christ Church School
 Cosmopolitan High School
 C P Goenka International School
 Dayanand Anglo Vedic Public School, Airoli
 Dhirubhai Ambani International School
 Don Bosco High School, Matunga
 Dr. Antonio Da Silva High School and Junior College of Commerce
 DSB International School
 E.E.E. Sassoon High School
 Ecole Mondiale World School, Juhu
 Edubridge International School
 Fort Convent School, Mumbai
 Fr. Agnel Multipurpose School and Junior College
 Girton High School
 Gokuldham High School
 Greenlawns High School
 Garodia International Centre for Learning
 Hansraj Morarji Public School
 Hiranandani Foundation School, Powai
 Holy Family High School
 Inodai Waldorf School
 Jamnabai Narsee School
 J.B. Petit High School for Girls
 Kendriya Vidyalaya, IIT Powai
 Lakshdham High School 
 Lilavatibai Podar High School 
 Mount Litera School International
 MET Rishikul Vidyalaya
 Michael High School, Kurla
 Navy Children School, Mumbai
 NES High School
 Oberoi International School 
 Oriental Education Society 
 Our Lady of Perpetual Succour High School
 Parle Tilak Vidyalaya Marathi Medium Secondary School
 Pawar Public School
 P. G. Garodia School, Ghatkopar
 Podar International School
 R D Memorial High School, Naigaon
 R. N. Podar School
 Raja Shivaji Vidyalaya
 Rajhans Vidyalaya
 RBK International Academy
 Ryan International School, Kandivali
 Ryan International School, Malad
 Ryan International School, Goregaon
 Ryan International School, Nallasopara 
 Saint Francis D'Assisi High School
 Saraswati Mandir High School, Mahim
 Seven Eleven Scholastic School, Mira Road
 Sheth Gopalji Hemraj High School
 Sheth Madhavdas Amarsey High School
 Sir Cowasjee Jehangir High School
 Singapore International School, Mumbai
 South Indian Education Society High School
 St. Ignatius High School, Mahalaxmi
 St. Joseph's High School, Umerkhadi
 St. Mary's Convent High School, Mulund
 St. Mary's High School SSC
 St. Mary's School, Mumbai
 St. Mary's High School SSC, Dahisar 
 St. Stanislaus High School
 St. Teresa's High School, Charni Road
 St. Theresa's Boys High School
 St. Xavier's High School, Borivali
 St. Xavier's Boys' Academy, Mumbai
 St. Xavier's High School, Fort
 Swami Vivekanand International School and Junior College
 Thakur Public School
 The Cathedral and John Connon School
 The French International School of Mumbai
 Udayachal High School
 Universal English High School Goregaon West
 Utpal Shanghvi School
 Vibgyor High School, Borivali
 Vibgyor High School, Goregaon
 Vibgyor High School, Malad East
 Vibgyor High School, Malad West

Miscellany
 Bhabha Atomic Research Centre (BARC)
 Centre for Excellence in Basic Sciences (UM-DAE CBS)
 D. G. Ruparel College of Arts, Science and Commerce
 Jamnalal Bajaj Institute of Management Studies (JBIMS)
 Nehru Planetarium
 Nehru Science Centre
 National Institute of Industrial Engineering (NITIE)
 Ramnarain Ruia College
 Ramniranjan Anandilal Podar College of Commerce and Economics
 Sathaye College
 SNDT Women's University
 SP Jain Institute of Management and Research
 St. Xavier's College, Mumbai
 Tata Institute of Fundamental Research (TIFR)
 Tata Institute of Social Sciences (TISS)

References

Mumbai

Educational institutions